Richard Hurd may refer to:

Richard Hurd (bishop) (1720–1808), Anglican bishop of Worcester
Richard Hurd (educator), American academic and labor union scholar
Richard Melancthon Hurd (1865–1941), American real estate banker and political activist
Richard Hurd (cricketer) (born 1970), English cricketer

See also
Richard Herd (1932–2020), American actor